Kenneth Carlsen but lost in the second round to Robin Söderling.

Tommy Haas is the champion defeating Robin Söderling in the finals 6–3, 6–2.

Seeds

Draw

Finals

Top half

Bottom half

External links
Draw
Qualifying Draw

2006 ATP Tour
2006 WTA Tour
Singles